A.D. Frazier Jr. (born June 1944) is an American business executive. Frazier served as the Chief Operating Officer for the Atlanta Committee for the Olympic Games. He has held executive positions with INVESCO, Caremark, Gold Kist, and Danka Business Systems .

Career
Frazier started his career as a lawyer at C&S Bank in Atlanta. He went on to manage the 1977 inauguration of President Jimmy Carter and headed the team reorganizing the White House and Executive Office of the President, also under President Carter. Frazier was also the first chairman of Georgia Public Broadcasting and helped merge two public television stations into one state agency.

After the 1996 Summer Olympics in Atlanta, Frazier went on to hold the position of President and CEO of INVESCO, a global investment management group. During his career, Frazier has also served as the Chairman and CEO of the Chicago Stock Exchange.

Frazier is the owner and chairman of WolfCreek Broadcasting, a radio broadcasting company in North Georgia. He is also the COO and co-founder of BOTH USA, LLC. He currently serves on the Board of Directors of the Alliance Theatre in Atlanta. He was nominated to the Board of Directors of the Tennessee Valley Authority by President Donald Trump and sworn into office on January 9, 2018.

References

External links
 BOTH website
 LA Times: Atlanta Claims Its Place in Sun
 Atlanta Business Chronicle: A.D. Frazier joins Balch & Bingham
 Atlanta Business Chronicle: Frazier looks back on ’96 Olympics

1951 births
Living people
Corporate executives
American chief operating officers
American chairpersons of corporations
American lawyers
Date of birth missing (living people)
Place of birth missing (living people)